The Carte Vitale is the health insurance card of the national health care system in France. It was introduced in 1998 to allow a direct settlement with the medical arm of the social insurance system. The declaration of a primary health insurance company (Caisse primaire d'assurance maladie) substitutes the card usage.

Since 2008, a second generation of smart cards is being introduced—the "Carte Vitale 2" carries a picture for identification and the smart card has additional functions of an electronic health insurance card to carry electronic documents of the treatment process. The first generation had been a family card carrying the names of all family members, thereby simply declaring they are covered by the French social security health care, while non-residents would need to use the European Health Insurance Card to prove their health insurance status.

To be eligible for a Carte Vitale, you must be a citizen of France for 3 or more years. a Carte Vitale can be ordered from the official social security website of France, and will come in the mail within a 1-2 month period.

See also

 Electronic health record
 European health insurance card
 Italian health insurance card

References

External links 
 

Health insurance cards
Health insurance in France